Kalle Mäkinen (born 1 February 1989) is a Finnish footballer who last played for the Finnish Veikkausliiga club Maskun Palloseura. He was nicknamed "Sergio" because his style of play was similar to that of Spanish fullback Sergio Ramos.

References

External links
 

1989 births
Living people
Finnish footballers
Turun Palloseura footballers
Veikkausliiga players
Maskun Palloseura players
Association football defenders
Footballers from Turku